Cordova is a city in Chugach Census Area, Alaska, United States. It lies near the mouth of the Copper River, at the head of Orca Inlet on the east side of Prince William Sound. The population was 2,609 at the 2020 census, up from 2,239 in 2010.

Cordova was named Puerto Córdoba (after Córdoba, Spain) by Spanish explorer Salvador Fidalgo in 1790. No roads connect Cordova to other Alaskan communities, so a plane or ferry is required to travel there. In the Exxon Valdez oil spill of March 1989, an oil tanker ran aground northwest of Cordova, heavily damaging ecology and fishing. It was cleaned up shortly after, but there are lingering effects, such as a lowered population of some birds.

History

In 1790, the inlet in front of the current Cordova townsite was named Puerto Cordova by Spanish explorer Salvador Fidalgo, after Spanish admiral Luis de Córdova y Córdova. The city of Cordova was named after it, although the inlet itself was later renamed the Orca Inlet. Cordova proper was founded as a result of the discovery of high-grade copper ore at Kennecott, north of Cordova. A group of surveyors from Valdez laid out a town site and Michael James Heney purchased half the land for the terminus of the Copper River and Northwestern Railway after determining that the neighboring town of Katalla was a poor harbor.  Heney and his crew held a brief ceremony to organize the town on March 26, 1906. A week later, crews arrived to begin work on the railroad. The first lots in the new town site, making up the heart of present-day Cordova, were sold at auction in May 1908. As the railroad grew, so did the town. Eventually schools, businesses, a hospital, and utilities were established. After the railroad was completed, Cordova became the transportation hub for the ore coming out of Kennecott. From 1911 to 1938, more than 200 million tons of copper ore were transported through Cordova.

The area around Cordova was historically home to the Eyak, with a population of Chugach to the west, and occasional visits from Ahtna and Tlingit people for trade or battle. The last fluent Eyak speaker Marie Smith Jones died in 2008, but the native people, as well as their traditions and lifestyle, continue to thrive in the region. 
Cordova was also once the home of a booming razor clam industry. Between 1916 and the late 1950s, it was known as the "Razor Clam Capital of the World".  Commercial harvest in the area reached as high as 3.5 million pounds. Returns began declining in the late 1950s, presumably due to overharvesting and a large die-off in 1958. The 1964 Good Friday earthquake effectively obliterated the industry; in some areas, the ground was thrust up by as much as six feet, exposing the already depleted clam beds. There has been no commercial harvest in the area since 1988 with the exception of a brief harvest in 1993.

In March 1989 the Exxon Valdez oil tanker ran aground on Bligh Reef north of Cordova causing one of the most devastating environmental disasters in North America. The Exxon Valdez oil spill severely affected the area's salmon and herring populations leading to a recession of the local fishing-reliant economy as well as a disruption to the area's ecology. After many years of litigation, 450 million dollars were awarded for compensatory and punitive damages.

Demographics

Cordova first appeared on the 1910 U.S. Census as an incorporated city. It incorporated the year before in 1909.

As of the 2010 United States Census, there were 2,239 people living in the city. The racial makeup of the city was 68.3% White, 0.4% Black, 8.7% Native American, 10.7% Asian, <0.1% Pacific Islander and 7.6% from two or more races. 4.2% were Hispanic or Latino of any race.

As of the census of 2000, there were 2,454 people, 958 households, and 597 families living in the city. The racial makeup of the city was 71.1% White, 23.6% Alaska Native and other Native American, 10.1% Asian, 0.4% Black or African American, 1.3% from other races, and 6.7% from two or more races. Hispanics or Latinos of any race were 3.1% of the population.

There were 958 households, out of which 36.1% had children under the age of 18 living with them, 49.5% were married couples living together, 8.1% had a female householder with no husband present, and 37.6% were non-families. 30.3% of all households were made up of individuals, and 5.4% had someone living alone who was 65 years of age or older. The average household size was 2.48 and the average family size was 3.17.

The age distribution was 28.0% under the age of 18, 7.1% from 18 to 24, 32.8% from 25 to 44, 25.4% from 45 to 64, and 6.8% who were 65 years of age or older. The median age was 37 years. For every 100 females, there were 119.5 males. For every 100 females age 18 and over, there were 120.4 males.

The median income for a household in the city was $50,114, and the median income for a family was $65,625. Males had a median income of $40,444 versus $26,985 for females. The per capita income for the city was $25,256. About 4.3% of families and 7.5% of the population were below the poverty line, including 8.2% of those under the age of 18 and 6.2% of those 65 and older.

Geography
Cordova is located within the Chugach National Forest at  (60.542805, −145.760164).
The total area is 18.87% water.

Climate
Cordova has a subpolar oceanic climate (Cfc) bordering on a humid continental climate (Dfb) with cool to mild, rainy summers and moderately cold, extremely snowy winters. Precipitation is very heavy year round.

Cordova has a subpolar oceanic climate (Cfc) according to the Köppen climate classification system with cool temperatures and heavy rainfall caused by orographic lift. Westerly winds coming off the North Pacific Ocean are forced upwards by the Chugach Mountains which causes the air mass to cool and creates clouds and precipitation. Snow falls mostly from December to March, and an average of  falls yearly.

Most official climate data is recorded at the airport, which is 11 miles from the settlement. Temperatures and precipitation vary drastically between the city and the airport, and precipitation at the city is commonly twice that of the airport.

Economy

Commercial fishing is the main industry in Cordova. Half of all households in Cordova have at least one person involved in commercial fishing or processing. The fishing fleet mainly fishes the Prince William Sound and Copper River Delta area. There are various fisheries in the area, the most economically important of which is the salmon fishery.

All Pacific salmon species except for the cherry salmon are caught. Fishermen use either a purse seine, drift gillnet, or set gillnet to catch the fish. All fisheries are regulated by the Alaska Department of Fish and Game. The fisheries in Alaska have a limited entry permit system. The first fish processing plant near Cordova opened in 1887. In 2009 there were 159 purse seine, 511 drift gilnet, and 27 set gillnet permits fished in the Prince William Sound and Copper River Delta area.

Arts and culture
Various festivals and celebrations take place throughout the year. The Copper River Delta Shorebird Festival, hosted by the Cordova Chamber of Commerce, takes place each year in early May. Millions of migrating shorebirds stop in the area to rest and feed before finishing their journey north. The most numerous species are the western sandpiper, least sandpiper, and dunlin. This is a popular time for avid and casual bird watchers to visit. Activities, workshops, and bird watching tours are held throughout the week.

The Cordova Iceworm Festival takes place each February. Activities include a parade, talent show, royal crowning ceremony, and various competitions such as an oyster shucking contest, ping pong tournament, and a survival suit race.

Copper River Wild Salmon Festival takes place in July at the Mt. Eyak ski area and includes various events.  Salmon Jam Music Festival serves as one of the main events and a fund raiser for Cordova Arts, where local musicians perform followed by professional acts and takes place over the course of Friday and Saturday nights. Taste of Cordova, a wild food and Copper River salmon cook off, usually starts the events. Entries are made with a variety of wild, locally harvested foods and are judged by a panel of guest chefs and food writers. The Alaska Salmon Runs start Saturday morning and include a marathon, half marathon, 10k, 5k, and a 1-mile race on the Copper River Highway. Small Fry activities are educational events for children and families that take place during the races.

The Cordova Historical Museum has exhibits on the Copper River and Northwestern Railway, the local fishing industry, and Alaska Natives. They also host a juried art show called "Fish Follies".

The Ilanka Cultural Center museum features exhibits on Eyak, Alutiiq, Ahtna and Tlingit history and contemporary life – including artifacts, photographs, and oral histories. The 24-1/2-foot orca whale, Eyak, is one of only five fully rearticulated orca whale skeletons in the world.

The Cordova Ikumat Alutiiq group was formed in 1995, composed of youth and adults, and is open to anyone who wants to join; the group performs songs from the past as well as original pieces. The Ilanka Cultural Center offers traditional arts and skills still practiced including skin sewing, beadwork; mask, totem, and ivory carving; "putting up" fish and deer; berry-picking and jam-making; and subsistence and commercial fishing.

Cordova Center
In late 2010, clearing the site and construction of a  community center, to be named the Cordova Center, began. The Cordova Center hosts a new library, museum, auditorium, conference and meeting space, plus city hall offices. It finally opened in the winter of 2015 for the residents of Cordova. Various events take place in the walls of this building such as community movie nights in the theater, winter bazaars, art shows, and many more.

Sports and recreation

Skiing is a popular activity in the winter. The surrounding Chugach Mountains provide excellent back country ski slopes. The Mt. Eyak ski area operates a single chair ski lift and rope tow. It is the oldest working ski lift in North America. Snowshoeing and ice skating are very popular sports around the Cordova area when conditions are right.

Hiking is available year-round on many trails. Some are within walking distance of the city while many others are a leisurely drive away."Easy Trails" include:
 Eyak River at Copper River Highway mile 5.7
 Alaganik Slough Trail via Copper River Highway to mile 16.9; turn south on Alaganik Slough Road then follow the main road for 2.9 miles. The trail begins on the east side of the road.
 Pipeline Lakes Trail at Copper River Highway mile 21.4
 McKinley Lake Trail at Copper River Highway mile 21.6
 Saddlebag Glacier Trail via Copper River Highway to mile 24.6; turn north on firewood cutting road; trail begins one mile away at the end of the road.

In the summer kayaking in Prince William Sound is popular. The Sound has more tidewater glaciers than any other region in North America.  of the western Sound are designated as the Nellie Juan College Fjord Wilderness Study Area.

Indoor recreation includes the Bob Korn Memorial Pool, and the Bidarki Fitness Center, which has a gym with basketball court upstairs, a weight room, and multiple spaces with cardio training equipment

The Meals Reservoir Disc Golf Course is a public disc golf course erected in the summer of 2018, located near Meals Reservoir off Whitshed Rd.

Government

The City of Cordova has a Council-Manager type government. The City Council is the legislative body and has 7 seats. The council is presided over by the Mayor. The Mayor is the ceremonial head of city government and has the power to veto any ordinance. The city council appoints the City Manager for an indefinite term (he may be removed at any time by the council). The City Manager is head of the administrative branch of the city government. He executes all ordinances and laws and administers the government of the city.

The city levies a property tax as well as a 6 percent sales tax.

Education
The Cordova School District operates the schools in the community. Mt. Eccles elementary school is the only public primary education facility in Cordova and had an enrollment of 206 students in 2008. Public secondary education is served by a single combined junior and senior high school. The high school had an enrollment of 205 students in 2008. The Cordova School District has 26 employed teachers. Post secondary education is provided by the Prince William Sound College, a community campus of University of Alaska Anchorage.

Media
The independently owned city newspaper, the Cordova Times, established in 1914 is published weekly and distributed every Friday.

There are three radio stations in the area. KLAM (1450 AM) began broadcasting in 1954 and generally plays classic rock, country, and news and talk shows. KCDV (100.9 FM) started in 1997 and plays top hits, 80's, and 90's music. Both stations are owned by Bayview Communications Inc. KCHU, based in Valdez operates a translator at 88.1 FM that serves Cordova public radio programming.

The Cordova area is often featured in ski films by director Warren Miller.

Transportation

Despite being on the mainland, Cordova is only accessible via boat or aircraft, as there is no road connecting the city to any other. It was previously accessible by railroad however the railway is no longer in use largely due to the 1964 Good Friday earthquake and the resulting destruction it caused to the Million Dollar Bridge. As of the summer of 2011, vehicle traffic can only reach the 36 mile mark as changes in the river course washed out the 339 bridge. The following 13.5 miles may still be accessed via a river crossing by boat. Cars and trucks can be transported to Cordova by ferry. Regular ferry service is provided by the state owned Alaska Marine Highway System to Valdez and Whittier with whistle stops (the ferry only stops if there are prior reservations) in Tatitlek and Chenega Bay. The M/V Aurora operates in Prince William Sound year round and the high-speed M/V Chenega operates the area in the summer.

Cordova has two airports. It has regular jet service provided by Alaska Airlines. It is located on Lake Eyak which also has a seaplane landing area. The municipal airport is mostly used by air taxis and personal aircraft.

Notable people
Marie Smith Jones (1918–2008), last native speaker of the Eyak language and last full blood Eyak
Cody McKenzie (born 1987), UFC fighter

See also
Miles Glacier Bridge
Mount Eyak

Notes

References

External links

 

1884 establishments in Alaska
Cities in Chugach Census Area, Alaska
 
Populated coastal places in Alaska on the Pacific Ocean
Populated places established in 1884